Tosatrochus attenuatus is a species of sea snail in the subfamily Cantharidinae of the family Trochidae, the top snails. It is the only species in the genus Tosatrochus.

Description
The length of the shell varies between 20 mm and 25 mm. The thick, imperforate or very narrowly perforate shell has a conic-elongated shape. It is whitish, ornamented with radiating livid-brown flammules, brown punctulate. The 9 whorls are convex, spirally lirate (the lirae unequal) and longitudinally nodose-costate, the nodules more prominent below. The sutures are impressed. The angulated body whorl is depressed beneath the sutures and nodulous at the periphery. It is very convex and with about 8 concentric lirae beneath, the interstices with intercalated lirulae. The aperture is subquadrate and canaliculate within. The basal margin is arcuate and plicate. The columella is subangular, concave, strongly truncate at base, with a short callus over the umbilicus.

Distribution
This species occurs in the Indo-West Pacific and off the Philippines and South Australia.

References

Trochidae
Monotypic gastropod genera